William Floyd (1734–1821) was an American farmer and signer of the Declaration of Independence for New York.

William Floyd may also refer to:
William Floyd (American football) (born 1972), American football player
William Floyd, editor of The Arbitrator, a New York City Atheist Magazine, unsuccessfully sued Harry Rimmer on the grounds that he had discovered five scientific errors in the Bible
William Floyd (mathematician)

See also
William Floyd School District, New York